Mithi, is a city and the capital of Tharparkar District in the Sindh province of Pakistan. It became the district headquarter of the Tharparkar District in 1990, after the area's separation from Mirpur Khas. Mithi is one of the very few regions in Pakistan where Hindus form a majority. Close to 80% of the population in this region belong to the Hindu community. Both Hindus and Muslims reportedly live peacefully and there has been no reports of religious intolerance.

Geography
The town is located at 24°74'0N 69°80'0E with an altitude of 28 metres (92 feet). It lies 450 kilometres from Karachi and is located in a desert area. To the south there is the village of Kertee, which is an older than Mithi and in the north about 20 KM village Amrio is located. Village of Faqeer Muqeem Kunbher Nohto is also 40 km north side. Gadhi Bhit is a picnic point of Mithi.

Economy
Mithi is now considered the heart of Tharparkar District with a high level of economic and social activity. It has seen a large increase in development. Significant numbers of people from all over the Tharparkar District have moved to the city.

According to the Thar Coal Mining Authority, preparations have been completed for them to start work on the open pit coal mine, which covers over 9,600 square km of Tharparkar District. 175 billion tonnes of coal, the world's 5th largest reserves of coal, are estimated to be available. The project has received financial assistance from China as part of the China-Pakistan Economic Corridor (CPEC). Almost 3,000 Chinese technicians and engineers are expected to arrive on site to help locals in running the heavy machinery. Roads, preliminary infrastructure and residential complexes for labourers are under construction.

Education
In April 2014, the Government of Sindh announced that it will establish a Cadet College in Mithi, Tharparkar District. There are two boys High Schools, i,e Amar Jagdesh Kumar Malani Government High school North Colony Mithi and Government (prov) High school Mithi established before Pakistan. There are three girls high schools in Mithi. There is Sadiq Faqeer Degree College and Government girls Degree college. Sindh Government has established a Government Elementary College of Education Mithi. There is a Technical College and also a Campus of NED University established in 2019.

Demographics

Languages 
The population of Mithi is over 47,073 as of 2017 Mithi's primary local language is Dhatki, one of the Rajasthani languages of the Indo-Aryan branch of the Indo-European language family. It is most closely related to Marwari. Sindhi is also widely understood by the local populace.

Religion

Majority of the population in Mithi belong to the Hindu community, and is one of the few areas of Sindh, Pakistan which are majorly non-Muslim.

Health
There is a civil hospital and various private medical centres. However, the basic health facilities like medicines and other related products are not available. In addition, patient rights are not being practiced. Hospital administration demands heavy amount against ambulance and other free services, etc.

See also
Sant Nenuram Ashram

References

External links

 Kertee

Tharparkar District
Populated places in Sindh
Hinduism in Sindh